The Great White is a steel inverted roller coaster at SeaWorld San Antonio, and the first roller coaster to be built at a SeaWorld park. It is not only the first inverted roller coaster in Texas, but also the first one in the state to be built by Bolliger & Mabillard.

Characteristics 
Despite its shortened track length, The Great White follows an identical ride layout as the Batman the Ride coasters at numerous Six Flags parks. At 2,562 feet (about 150 shorter than Batman's 2,693 foot layout), the coaster doesn't allow riders as much time to "recuperate" between inversions, consequently offering an extreme, forceful ride experience. Furthermore, The Great White sits lower to the ground, often deceiving its riders with elements such as "foot-choppers" as there are many trees and shrubs surrounding the coaster's track. The Great White is sometimes considered to be more intense than its Six Flags' cousin because of its added 8th row (Goliath has only seven rows per train) and shorter track length (2,562 feet, compared to Goliath's 2,700 feet. Its layout consists of the following inversions:

a Vertical Loop
a Zero-G Roll
a second Vertical Loop
a Wingover
a second Wingover

When The Great White opened, its queue line wrapped around a large-scale shark aquarium, similar to the manta aquariums found in the newly constructed Manta at SeaWorld Orlando. This was later removed, however, as the only people able to view the sharks were those waiting in line for the ride (Manta offers separate entrances for riders and non-riders). Nonetheless, SeaWorld's shark exhibit now sits at Discovery Point, just past the Dolphin Lagoon.

References 

Roller coasters operated by SeaWorld Parks & Entertainment
Roller coasters in Texas
Roller coasters introduced in 1997
SeaWorld San Antonio
Inverted roller coasters manufactured by Bolliger & Mabillard